The 2023 All-Ireland Senior Club Hurling Championship final is a hurling match that will be played at Croke Park on 22 January 2023 to determine the winners of the 2022-23 All-Ireland Senior Club Hurling Championship, the 52nd season of the All-Ireland Senior Club Hurling Championship, a tournament organised by the Gaelic Athletic Association for the champion clubs of the four provinces of Ireland. 

The final will be contested by Dunloy of Antrim and Ballyhale Shamrocks of Kilkenny.

Match

Details

References

2023 in hurling
2023